Cégep de Drummondville is a CEGEP in Drummondville, Quebec, Canada.

Programs
The Cégep de Drummondville offers types of programs: pre-university and technical. The pre-university programs, which take two years to complete, cover the subject matters which roughly correspond to the additional year of high school given elsewhere in Canada in preparation for a chosen field in university. The technical programs, which take three-years to complete, applies to students who wish to pursue a skill trade. In addition Continuing education and services to business are provided.
Music, Dance, Arts, 
Technology, Office automation, Accounting and management, 
Electronics, Estimation and evaluation of buildings, 
Management, Engineering mechanical, Data-processing, 
transportation logistics, plant maintenance and nursing.

History
The college traces its origins to the merger of several institutions which became public ones in 1967, when the Quebec system of CEGEPs was created. On April 15, 1968,  les Corporations de l'Externat Classique Saint-Raphaël et du Collège Marie-de-la-Présentation partnered for the school year 1968–1969. Over time, other institutions in Drummondville joined in the partnership: L'école des Infirmières, l'Institut familial Sainte-Marie et le cours technique de l'École de Métiers. The Cégep de Drummondville was founded in 1968 with 500 students in the first year. It affiliated with the Cégep of Saint-Hyacinthe in 1970. In 1972, a partnership of CEGEPS from Drummondville, Saint-Hyacinthe and Sorel formed le Collège régional Bourgchemin.

In 1980, the government of Quebec granted a charter of Cégep de Drummondville and the CEGEP opened its doors on May 13, 1980 – 1981 with 1171 students in pre-university teaching and 475 in continuing education. Since 1968, Cégep de Drummondville was housed in a variety of temporary buildings. In 1982, the Cégep moved in its new facility at 960, rue Saint-Georges. In January 1986, Cégep takes possession of phase II of its building. In 1990, the CEGEP was enlarged to accommodate 1800 students. The maximum number d' students (nearly 2000) was in 1995–1996. In 2006 Cégep de Drummondville counts 1900 students with pre-university teaching and nearly 200 in continuing education.

Gallery

See also
List of colleges in Quebec
Higher education in Quebec

References

External links
Cégep de Drummondville Website in French

Drummondville
Drummondville
Buildings and structures in Centre-du-Québec
Education in Centre-du-Québec